Myjava (historically also Miava) is a town in Trenčín Region, Slovakia.

Geography
It is located in the Myjava Hills at the foothills of the White Carpathians and nearby the Little Carpathians. The river Myjava flows through the town. It is 10 km away from the Czech border, 35 km from Skalica and 100 km from Bratislava.

History
The settlement was established in 1533 and was colonized by two groups of inhabitants: refugees fleeing from the Ottomans in southern Upper Hungary (today mostly Slovakia) and inhabitants from north-western and northern Upper Hungary. 

During the Revolutions of 1848, the first Slovak National Council met in the town as a result of the Slovak Uprising. Today, the house of their meeting is now part of the Museum of the Slovak National Councils, a part of the Slovak National Museum network.

Demographics
According to the 2001 census, 95.5% of the inhabitants were Slovaks, 1.5% Czechs and 0.4% Roma. The religious makeup was 51.4% Lutherans, 28.2% people with no religious affiliation and 14.2% Roman Catholics.

Twin towns — sister cities

Myjava is twinned with:

 Dolní Němčí, Czech Republic
 Kostelec nad Orlicí, Czech Republic
 Flisa, Norway
 Åsnes, Norway
 Janošik, Serbia
 Oroszlány, Hungary
 Little Falls, NY

References

External links

 Official website

Cities and towns in Slovakia